Collins Beach is an unincorporated community in New Castle County, Delaware, United States. Collins Beach is located along the Delaware Bay at the eastern end of Collins Beach Road, northeast of Smyrna.

References

Unincorporated communities in New Castle County, Delaware
Unincorporated communities in Delaware
Beaches of Delaware